Amanda Coetzer and Lori McNeil were the defending champions, but none competed this year.

Virginia Ruano Pascual and Paola Suárez won the title, defeating Émilie Loit and Rossana de los Ríos 6–4, 6–1 in the final. It was the 17th title for Ruano Pascual and the 25th title for Suárez in their respective careers. It was also the 7th title for the pair during this season.

Seeds

Draw

Draw

Qualifying

Seeds

Qualifiers

Draw

References
 Main and Qualifying Draws (ITF)
 Main and Qualifying Draws (WTA)

2002 WTA Tour
2002 Brasil Open